Follafoss is a village in the municipality of Steinkjer in Trøndelag county, Norway. The village lies on the northern shore of the Beitstadfjorden, about halfway between the east and west end of the fjord. The Follaelva river empties into the Trondheimsfjord at Follafoss. The lakes Holden and Selavatnet both feed the river and also provide power through the Nord-Trøndelag Elektrisitetsverk power company through hydroelectric power from the dams on the lakes.

Follafoss Church is located in the village. There is a pulp mill in the village, MMK FollaCell A.S., which is the largest employer in the area.

References

External links
Område: Follafoss 

Villages in Trøndelag
Steinkjer